Red Queen, in comics, may refer to:

Marvel Comics characters:
Members of the London branch of the Hellfire Club, where the rank is equivalent to White Queen:
Margali Szardos
Psylocke, in the Days of Future Past timeline
Red Queen, Hank Pym's daughter Hope Pym from the MC2 universe who becomes a supervillain and member of the Revengers
Red Queen (Jean Grey), an evil version of Jean Grey from Earth-9575, who replaced Madelyne Pryor and ruled Earth-998
Red Queen (Madelyne Pryor), the alias used by Pryor since her return to Marvel Comics
The Red Queen, an alias used by Martha Kent to disrupt the Checkmate organization on the television series Smallville
Blood Red Queen, a character who appeared in the "Vengeance of Vampirella" storyline

See also
Red Queen (disambiguation)
Red King (comics)

References